Broadcast media is being utilized by the Members Church of God International (MCGI), an international Christian religious organization with headquarters in the Philippines, to preach the gospel and expand internationally. The church is producing religious programs in different languages, aired in various countries, by acquiring time slots on several television stations. The church also maintains its own radio and television network for its 24/7 terrestrial, satellite and internet broadcasts.

The MCGI started as a small group with less than a hundred believers in 1977. It is popularly known in the Philippines as Ang Dating Daan (ADD) (English: The Old Path), the title of its flagship radio and television program and currently the longest-running religious program in the Philippines with Eliseo Soriano (also known as "Bro. Eli") as the program's main host and the "Overall Servant" (Former title: "Presiding Minister") to MCGI. Most of its broadcast ministries are directly funded by the church, through voluntary contributions from its members, as the church do not accept monetary donations from non-members. Meanwhile, a few of its news and public affairs programs in the Philippines are supported by commercial advertisements.

Its global evangelism is conducted mostly via AM radio, FM radio, terrestrial television, cable television and direct-to-home satellite transmissions. Other platforms include internet streaming, mobile applications and various forms of social media. The group also conducts regular Bible Expositions aired live via satellite in all MCGI local congregations and through the "MCGI Broadcast" mobile app.

History
Soriano started his nightly town-to-town preaching in the 1970s but eventually realized that his lifetime is not enough to reach the entire Philippines. In 1980, he decided to go on radio and after a few years on television to preach the gospel. In 1999, the church took advantage of the advancement in internet technology. Its foray into satellite broadcasting happened in 2004, to reach more souls in different countries around the globe.

In October 1980, the 30-minute radio program Ang Dating Daan was aired on DWWA 1206 kHz with a shoe-string budget. In February 1983, the program made its inaugural broadcast on television through IBC Channel 13. In 1997, the program moved to RJTV Channel 29, government-owned PTV-4 and later on SBN 21. In 1999, the church launched a nationwide radio broadcast through DZRH, RMN and 100 Radyo Natin stations.

Radio and television
The UNTV Public Service channel, Radyo La Verdad 1350 kHz, Wish FM 107.5, The Truth Channel, TV Verdade and TV La Verdad are the official religious media services of the Members Church of God International.

Between 2010 and 2011, the MCGI programs reached the airwaves of India, Uruguay, Argentina, Bolivia and Portugal. To further boost viewership, the church acquired a 30-minute slot on Fox Channel which can be seen in over 50 cable networks in Central and South America. In 2012, MCGI launched its own channel TV La Verdad (English: Truth TV) for Spanish-speaking countries. In 2012, through a blocktime agreement with PBC, MCGI's own radio station in Mega Manila, UNTV Radio La Verdad 1350 kHz was launched.

International broadcasts
Ang Dating Daan is being aired internationally, with programs usually lasting for an hour or two, through blocktime agreements with local television networks.

UNTV Public Service channel (Philippines)
In 2004, UNTV-37 became the permanent home of MCGI when it acquired an exclusive blocktime agreement with UNTV's parent, the Progressive Broadcasting Corporation.  In 2007, the station became a "Public Service Channel" when MCGI affiliate Breakthrough and Milestones Productions International, Inc. (BMPI), acquired the entire production and management operations of UNTV. The station operates 24/7 in Metro Manila and surrounding provinces with a power of 30 kilowatts, with several low-powered relay stations in the provinces. UNTV was aired nationwide via Mabuhay Agila 2. In 2011, UNTV left Agila 2 and transferred its free-to-air broadcast feed to MEASAT-3a satellite which covers Asia and selected parts of Australia, Middle East, Europe and Africa. UNTV is also being carried by Sky Cable and more than 200 local cable operators and Cignal, the largest direct-to-home satellite provider in the Philippines. In 2016 until 2020, it included in the line-up of ABS-CBN's newest DTH service, Sky Direct.

Digital terrestrial (ISDB-T)

Analog broadcast

Cable television

Direct-to-home (DTH) satellite

Radyo La Verdad (Mega Manila and surrounding areas)
In late 2011, Breakthrough and Milestones Productions International Inc. (BMPI) took over the management and broadcast operations of Mabuhay Broadcasting System's DWUN (formerly DZXQ) and immediately run a test broadcast using UNTV broadcast feed. On January 16, 2012, it was formally launched as UNTV Radio La Verdad 1350 kHz along with the UNTV Mobile Radio booth, a first in Philippine radio history. It operates in Mega Manila with a 50,000 watts output. On February 13, 2017, the station changed its branding to simply Radyo La Verdad 1350 kHz.

Wish 107.5 (Mega Manila and surrounding areas) 
In 2014, BMPI led by its Chairman and CEO "Kuya" Daniel Razon (also known as "Dr. Clark" on air), took over the management of 107.5 MHz frequency. The station transferred its studios from AIC Gold Tower in Pasig (its home since NU 107 era) to its current studio at UNTV Building in Quezon City. After getting access to 107.5 FM, BMPI finally occupied one of PBC's FM radio frequencies in Mega Manila that solidified its influence including other platforms of PBC on AM and TV, removing its connection to the defunct un-tee-vee era. At the same time, the station's transmitter facilities shifted from the old UNTV transmitter compound in Crestview Subd. to the new UNTV transmission tower in Sumulong Highway, Antipolo City.

TV Verdade (Brazil)
In December 2009, the church's own religious channel TV Verdade (English: Truth TV) was launched in Brazil, airing O Caminho Antiguo in Portuguese via satellite. Its broadcast feed originates from a small garage, around 48 square meters, transformed into a makeshift broadcasting studio located in Florianópolis, the capital city of the state of Santa Catarina. In 2015, TV Verdade was granted the authority by Ministério das Comunicações (English: Ministry of Communications, abbreviated as "MiniCom") of Brazil to build and operate its own broadcast network. The network roll-out started in Minas Gerais, Brazil's second most populous state then followed by relay stations in the state of Paraná). In May 2016, its relay station in the municipality of Cornélio Procópio in Paraná was activated.

TV La Verdad (El Salvador)
In February 2014, MCGI began its 24/7 free-to-air terrestrial broadcast of TV La Verdad (English "The Truth TV") in El Salvador, the smallest and most densely populated country in Central America.

Satellite broadcasting
On October 7, 2004, the church administration signed a contract with GlobeCast to air the TOP Channel in United States and Canada via a direct-to-home satellite broadcast, its own television channel featuring "The Old Path" as flagship program. On March 24, 2010, TOP Channel was aired in the Asia-Pacific region through Dream Satellite TV. Today, MCGI programs are carried by at least seven satellites across the globe.

References

Members Church of God International
Mass media in the Philippines
Christian media by denomination